The Miniature Railway Company on Broadway in Manhattan, New York, operated their ridable miniature railways at four World Expositions around 1900 and delivered them to many parks throughout the world.

History 

The company was founded in 1898 by Timothy Cagney and his brothers David and John, after they had run a ticket brokerage company known as Cagney Bros. in New York in the early 1890s.
They lived in Jersey City, but their office was at 301, 407 and finally 74 Broadway in New York, until it was relocated to New Jersey.

The locomotives were manufactured by the McGarigle Machine Company initially in Niagara Falls, New York and later in Jersey City. This company belonged to Thomas and Peter McGarigle, whose sister Winifred was married to Timothy Cagney. The two companies worked very closely together for several years on various projects. Their Class C was  gauge, their Class D, which was upgraded in 1903, was  gauge and their Class E, which was introduced in 1904, was  gauge.

By the 1920s the Cagney Bros. had absorbed the miniature railway portion of the McGarigle Machine Company under the name of The Cagney Brothers' Amusement Company Niagara Falls Plant. 
In total, the group of companies built about 1300 locomotives in many different sizes and gauges, before it went out of business in 1948.

Product range  
The company's speciality was the manufacture of light steam locomotives with varying sizes and designs for many gauges, wide or narrow. The locomotives were well adapted for industrial purposes, where ordinary locomotives were unsuitable or too expensive. Logging railroads of the Miniature Railway Co. were in use in the southern Atlantic and Gulf states, the northern lake districts and on the Pacific coast. They were exported to the United Kingdom, Latin America, Russia, South Africa, Japan, Thailand, Australia and New Zealand.

Two of Cagney's most important installations were two gold-plated trains with steam locomotives built for the King of Siam, and the Trip Around the World exhibit at the 1939 New York World's Fair at a cost of $200.000. One locomotive was exported in 1902 to the Blakesley Miniature Railway in Northamptonshire in the vicinity of Wenman Joseph Bassett-Lowke's company Miniature Railways of Great Britain Ltd in Northampton, which began in 1904 to manufacture their own series of  gauge locomotives. One  gauge model locomotive and three carriages for 18 passengers was exported in 1906 to Australia, to run in circles on Manly’s beachfront.

Trans-Mississippi Exposition 

The Miniature Railway Company obtained the probably smallest locomotive ever made (at the time) for drawing passenger cars from Thomas E. McGarigle of Niagara Falls. This steam locomotive was used from June 1 to November 1 of 1898 at the Trans-Mississippi Exposition in Omaha, Nebraska, and, in all, six locomotives were ordered by the company under one contract.

Hard coal was used as fuel. The locomotive was equipped with sandbox, bell, etc., and had a steam brake between the drivers. One man, whose position was on a seat on top of the tender, operated the engine. The scale on which the locomotive was built was about one-seventh that of one of the New York Central's largest engines, and as it stood in the shop it had a very businesslike appearance.

Pan-American Exposition

The Cagney brothers built and operated a  gauge miniature railway at the Pan-American Exposition held in Buffalo, New York, United States, 
from May 1 until November 2, 1901. With a ticket that cost 10 cents, passengers could board small, open cars and ride on six sections to the end of the line.
 
They had a Kortling injector and a special pump.

It was made from iron and supplied with wrench, shovel, flue cleaner and rake.

Two different types of cars for two or eight passengers were used.

Charleston Exposition 

At the Charleston Exposition from December 1, 1901 to June 20, 1902 the lilliputian railways installed by the Miniature Railway Co. comprised one of the most popular attractions and best-paying amusement features on the grounds. The routes touched all points of interest from the Sunken Gardens and the Court of Palaces to the hoky-poky dance floor in the headquarters. Patrons found these baby trains an indispensable convenience as well as a joyful novelty in the manner of transportation.

The difference, and that was in favor of the Lilliput, was that on this ideal system there were no baggage-men to badger one, no porters that one must tip, nor any man with a megaphone voice to assail one with magazines and samples of chewing gum.

Louisiana Purchase Exposition 

In 1903 the Cagney Bros. Timothy Cagney was listed as President, and Peter McGarigle as Chief Engineer. They operated twenty  gauge 4-4-0s and four  gauge 4-4-0s as public transportation on the fairgrounds.

Footnotes

References

External links

 Shorpy #1
 Shorpy #2
 Jeff Terry: Preservation on a Smaller Scale
 John Morcombe: The tiny trains that went in circles on the Manly’s beachfront. Manly Daily, June 24, 2016
 Central Mass. Steam, Gas & Machinery Association

Miniature railways
Defunct locomotive manufacturers of the United States
Privately held companies based in New Jersey
History of Charleston, South Carolina
12½ in gauge railways
15 in gauge railways in the United States
1 ft 10 in gauge railways
World's fairs